Sotirios Moutsanas (born 2 January 1958) is a retired Greek middle distance runner who specialized in the 800 metres.

He won the bronze medal at the 1979 Mediterranean Games and the silver medal at the 1981 Summer Universiade. He also competed at the 1983 World Championships and the 1984 Olympic Games without reaching the final.

His personal best time was 1:46.36 minutes, achieved during the 1984 Olympics in Los Angeles. This ranks him second on the Greek all-time list, only behind Panagiotis Stroubakos.

References 

1958 births
Living people
Greek male middle-distance runners
Athletes (track and field) at the 1984 Summer Olympics
Olympic athletes of Greece
Universiade medalists in athletics (track and field)
Mediterranean Games bronze medalists for Greece
Mediterranean Games medalists in athletics
Athletes (track and field) at the 1979 Mediterranean Games
Universiade silver medalists for Greece
Medalists at the 1981 Summer Universiade
20th-century Greek people